Joaquin Rafael Phoenix (Bottom; born October 28, 1974) is an American actor. He is known for playing dark and unconventional characters in independent films. He has received various accolades, including an Academy Award, a British Academy Film Award, a Grammy Award, and two Golden Globe Awards. In 2020, The New York Times named him one of the greatest actors of the 21st century.

Phoenix began his career by appearing in television series in the early 1980s with his brother River. His first major film roles were in SpaceCamp (1986) and Parenthood (1989). During this period, he was credited as Leaf Phoenix, a name he gave himself. He took back his birth name in the early 1990s and received critical acclaim for his supporting roles in the comedy-drama To Die For (1995) and the period film Quills (2000). Phoenix received further critical acclaim and a nomination for the Academy Award for Best Supporting Actor for his portrayal of Commodus in the historical drama Gladiator (2000). He had success with the horror films Signs (2002) and The Village (2004), the historical drama Hotel Rwanda (2004), and won a Grammy Award, a Golden Globe Award and a nomination for the Academy Award for Best Actor for his portrayal of musician Johnny Cash in the biopic Walk the Line (2005).

Following a brief sabbatical, Phoenix starred in the psychological drama The Master (2012), winning the Volpi Cup for Best Actor and earning his third Academy Award nomination. He received Golden Globe Award nominations for his roles in the romantic drama Her (2013) and the crime satire Inherent Vice (2014), and won the Cannes Film Festival Award for Best Actor for the psychological thriller You Were Never Really Here (2017). For his performance as the title character of Joker (2019), Phoenix won the Academy Award for Best Actor.

Phoenix is an animal rights activist. He has been vegan since the age of three and regularly supports charitable causes and has produced several documentaries on global meat consumption and its impact on the environment. He is in a relationship with actress Rooney Mara, with whom he has a son.

Early life
Joaquin Rafael Bottom was born on October 28, 1974, in the Río Piedras district of San Juan, Puerto Rico, to John Lee Bottom, the founder of a landscape gardening company, and Arlyn "Heart" Bottom (née Dunetz), who was an executive secretary at NBC and whose connection to an agent provided her children with acting work. He is the third of five children, following River (1970–1993) and Rain (born 1972), and preceding Liberty (born 1976) and Summer (born 1978), all of whom have been involved in acting. Phoenix also has two paternal half-sisters, Jodean (born 1964) and Hope (born  2009). His father was a Catholic from Fontana, California, and was of English, German and French ancestry. His maternal grandfather, Meyer Dunetz, was Russian Jewish and his maternal grandmother, Margit Lefkowitz, was Hungarian Jewish; they were both Ashkenazi Jews who resided in New York City. Phoenix's parents met when his mother was hitchhiking in California and got married less than a year after meeting.

Soon after the second child was born, they joined the religious cult called Children of God and started traveling throughout South America and Puerto Rico in the Caribbean as missionaries for the cult, where the next two children were born. They eventually grew disillusioned with Children of God and left in 1977, being opposed to the cult's increasingly distorted rules, particularly the practice of flirty fishing. The fifth child was born in Florida where the family settled for a while. It was also around this time they legally adopted the surname Phoenix, inspired by the mythical bird that rises from its own ashes, symbolizing a new beginning. When Phoenix was three, he and his older siblings witnessed fish being stunned as "they were throwing them against the side of the boat." This act made the whole family convert to veganism. He also began calling himself "Leaf", having been inspired by spending time outdoors raking leaves and desiring to have a nature-related name like his siblings. Leaf became the name he used before changing it back to his birth name Joaquin at the age of fifteen.

Career

1980–1993: Early work and family tragedy
In 1979, after Phoenix's father had to stop working because of an old spinal injury, the whole family moved to Los Angeles where the mother met a high-profile child agent named Iris Burton, who got the children into commercials and bit parts on TV. He made his acting debut alongside his brother in the television series Seven Brides for Seven Brothers in the 1982 episode "Christmas Song". He has said of his first time acting:
In 1984, Phoenix starred opposite his brother River in the ABC Afterschool Special entitled Backwards: The Riddle of Dyslexia, for which they shared a nomination for Best Young Actor in a Family Film Made for Television at the 6th Youth in Film Awards. He also made guest appearances in the Murder, She Wrote episode "We're Off to Kill the Wizard" and individual episodes of The Fall Guy and Hill Street Blues. A year later, Phoenix appeared in the television film Kids Don't Tell. To supplement their income, the kids sang their original songs like "Gonna Make It", written by River, and busked for money in matching yellow shirts and shorts. They also studied dance; Phoenix became an avid break dancer. Phoenix dropped out of high school when he was sent a dead frog in the mail to dissect for his biology studies, which prompted him to discontinue his studies. Dissatisfied with life in Los Angeles, the Phoenixes moved back to Florida, settling in Gainesville.

Phoenix made his feature film debut in the adventure film SpaceCamp (1986) as a young boy who goes to Kennedy Space Center to learn about the NASA space program and undergoes amateur astronaut training. He guest starred in the anthology series Alfred Hitchcock Presents episode "A Very Happy Ending" in the same year, playing a child who blackmails a hitman into killing his father. Phoenix's first starring role was in the film Russkies (1987), about a group of friends who unknowingly befriend a Russian soldier during the Cold War.

In 1989, Phoenix co-starred as Garry, the withdrawn teenage nephew of Steve Martin's character in Ron Howard's comedy-drama Parenthood. The film was a box office success, grossing $126 million worldwide against its $20 million budget. Critics praised the film, with IndieWire reviewers highlighting the film's cast and their performances for possessing "genuinely likable, and occasionally insightful, heart" calling Phoenix a "terrifically believable angsty adolescent", in a performance which garnered him a nomination for the Young Artist Award for Best Leading Young Actor in a Feature Film. The role of Garry was reprised in the series based on the film by Leonardo DiCaprio, who studied Phoenix's performance in order to get it right. After establishing himself as a child actor, Phoenix felt that he wasn't getting any appealing offers and decided to take a break from acting and traveled to Mexico with his father, learning Spanish. When he returned to the States, his brother River Phoenix suggested that Phoenix changed his name back to Joaquin and encouraged him to start acting again.

On October 31, 1993, River died of a drug overdose outside The Viper Room in West Hollywood. Phoenix, who had accompanied his brother and older sister Rain to the club, called 911 to seek help for his dying brother. After the death, the phone call was repeatedly broadcast on TV and radio shows. The family retreated to Costa Rica to escape the media glare as the event came to be depicted as a cautionary tale of young Hollywood surrounded by mythology and conspiracy.

1994–1999: Return to acting
Phoenix returned to acting in Gus Van Sant's 1995 black comedy To Die For, based on the novel of the same name by Joyce Maynard, which in turn was inspired by the Pamela Smart murder case. Phoenix starred as Jimmy Emmett, a disturbed young man who is seduced by a woman (Nicole Kidman) to commit murder. The film premiered at the 1995 Cannes Film Festival and became a financial and critical success, with New York Times critic Janet Maslin praising Phoenix's performance, writing "So pity poor Jimmy. Rivetingly played by Mr Phoenix with a raw, anguished expressiveness that makes him an actor to watch for, Jimmy is both tempted and terrified by Suzanne's slick amorality. In that, he speaks for us all."

In 1997, Phoenix played a small-town troublemaker in Oliver Stone's U Turn, and a poor man in love with a rich woman in Inventing the Abbotts. The films were received with mostly mixed and negative reviews, respectively, and neither performed well at the box office. The following year, Phoenix starred in Clay Pigeons as a young man in a small town who befriends a serial killer. The film was released to a dismal box office performance and was not well received by critics. In his next film, 8mm (1999), Phoenix co-starred as an adult video store employee who helps Tom Welles (Nicolas Cage) investigate the underworld of illegal pornography. The film turned out to be a box office success, grossing $96 million worldwide, but found few admirers among critics.

2000–2010: Critical acclaim and commercial success

In 2000, Phoenix co-starred in three films. In the first of these, he portrayed a fictionalized version of Roman Emperor Commodus in Ridley Scott's historical epic film Gladiator. The film received positive reviews and grossed $457 million worldwide, making it the second highest-grossing film of 2000. Chris Nashawaty of Entertainment Weekly called Phoenix's work "a more nuanced star-making performance" when comparing him to the lead Russell Crowe, writing "Phoenix turns what could have easily been a cartoonish villain into a richly layered study of pathology." Phoenix earned his first nominations for an Academy Award, a Golden Globe Award and a BAFTA Award in the Best Supporting Actor category. He and his late brother River became the first brothers to be nominated for acting Academy Awards. To this date, they are the only brothers to hold this distinction.

His next film marked his first collaboration with director James Gray in The Yards. The crime film follows the corruption in the rail yards of Queens. Although failing to perform well at the box office, The Yards received positive reviews from critics with many considering Phoenix's performance as the villain a stand out. The third release of 2000 was Philip Kaufman's Quills, a satirical thriller inspired by the life and work of the Marquis de Sade. Phoenix portrayed the conflicted priest Abbé de Coulmier opposite Kate Winslet. The film premiered at the Telluride Film Festival and was a modest art house success grossing a total of $17 million at the box office. It was received with critical praise with Peter Travers of Rolling Stone praising Phoenix and his chemistry with Winslet, stating "Phoenix, on a roll this year with Gladiator and The Yards, excels at making the priest a seductive figure — a neat trick considering the real Abbe was a four-foot hunchback. Winslet and Phoenix generate real fire, notably when Abbe dreams of ravishing Madeleine on the altar." For his combined roles of that year, Phoenix was awarded the Broadcast Film Critics Association Award for Best Supporting Actor and the National Board of Review Award for Best Supporting Actor.

The following year, Phoenix starred in the satirical film Buffalo Soldiers as a U.S. Army soldier. The world premiere was held at the 2001 Toronto International Film Festival in early September. However, because the film was a satire of the US military, its wider theatrical run was delayed by approximately two years because of the September 11 attacks; it was finally released on July 25, 2003. BBCs Nev Pierce wrote that "Phoenix is excellent as a Gen X Sergeant Bilko, ensuring his cheerfully amoral character never loses heart - showcasing tenderness, love, grief and fear as his games get out of control" and Phoenix received a nomination for the British Independent Film Award for Best Actor.

The science fiction thriller Signs (2002) marked Phoenix's first collaboration with director M. Night Shyamalan. In the film, he played Merrill Hess, a former Minor League baseball player who, along with his older brother Graham (Mel Gibson), discovers that Earth has been invaded by extraterrestrials. The film received mixed reviews from critics, but Phoenix's performance was praised, with critic Peter Travers writing that Phoenix "registers impressively, finding the humor and the pain in this lost boy [...] never making a false move as a helpless Merrill watches his rock of a brother crumble into a despairing crisis of faith." The film was a commercial success, grossing $408.2 million worldwide.

In 2003, Phoenix played the irresolute husband of a superstar-skater (Claire Danes) in Thomas Vinterberg's romance-drama It's All About Love, and voiced Kenai in the Disney animated film Brother Bear. Phoenix expressed immense joy being cast as the lead voice role in a Disney animated feature, stating "The real pinnacle [in my career] is that I'm playing an animated character in a Disney film. Isn't that the greatest?" The film grossed $250.4 million worldwide, and was nominated for the Academy Award for Best Animated Feature. He was replaced by Patrick Dempsey in the sequel Brother Bear 2. Phoenix reunited with Shyamalan in the period thriller The Village (2004). The film is about a village whose population lives in fear of creatures inhabiting the woods beyond it, referred to as "Those We Don't Speak Of". He played farmer Lucius Hunt, a role which Christopher Orr of The Atlantic found "underdeveloped". Though initially receiving mixed reviews, the film attracted retrospective reviews years after its release. Several critics deemed it one of Shyamalan's best films, praising Phoenix's "terrific" performance. The film was a financial success, grossing $256.7 million worldwide on its $60 million budget.

In his next film of the year, he starred opposite John Travolta in the drama film Ladder 49 as a Baltimore firefighter. In preparation for the role, Phoenix trained for two months with the Baltimore Fire Department, putting out actual fires. He admitted that he was afraid of heights before he started making this film, recalling "I got to the pole and I looked down and I couldn't do it. But you go through the training and it exposes your fears and helps you to overcome them. We ended up rappelling off a six-story tower and that really helped." The film earned $102.3 million at the box office despite receiving generally mixed reviews. Roger Ebert gave the film 3.5 out of 4 stars, praising the performances in the film. Phoenix's final film of 2004 was Terry George's Hotel Rwanda, playing cameraman Jack Daglish. Based on the Rwandan genocide, the film documents Paul Rusesabagina's (Don Cheadle) efforts to save the lives of his family and more than 1,000 other refugees by providing them with shelter in the besieged Hôtel des Mille Collines. The film was a moderate financial success but was a critical success, receiving almost exclusively positive reviews from critics. For his performance in the film, Phoenix was nominated for a Screen Actors Guild Award along with the cast.

In 2005, Phoenix co-starred alongside Reese Witherspoon in the James Mangold directed film Walk the Line, a Johnny Cash biopic, after Cash himself approved of Phoenix. All of Cash's vocal tracks in the film and on the accompanying soundtrack are played and sung by Phoenix. The film premiered at the Telluride Film Festival, eventually grossing $186 million worldwide. Phoenix's performance received rave reviews from critics and it inspired film critic Roger Ebert to write, "Knowing Johnny Cash's albums more or less by heart, I closed my eyes to focus on the soundtrack and decided that, yes, that was the voice of Johnny Cash I was listening to. The closing credits make it clear it's Joaquin Phoenix doing the singing, and I was gob-smacked". For his portrayal of Johnny Cash, he won the Golden Globe Award for Best Actor – Motion Picture Musical or Comedy and the Grammy Award for Best Compilation Soundtrack for Visual Media for the film's soundtrack. Phoenix also received a second Academy Award nomination, his first in the Best Actor category as well as a second BAFTA nomination. Earlier that year, he narrated Earthlings (2005), a documentary about the investigation of animal abuse in factory farms, and pet mills, and for scientific research. He was awarded the Humanitarian Award at the San Diego Film Festival in 2005, for his work and contribution to Earthlings. Animal rights philosopher Tom Regan remarked that "for those who watch Earthlings, the world will never be the same".

Phoenix's first producing task was the action thriller We Own the Night (2007), in which he played nightclub manager Bobby Green/Grusinsky who tries to save his brother (Mark Wahlberg) and father (Robert Duvall) from Russian mafia hitmen. The James Gray-directed film premiered at the 2007 Cannes Film Festival to mixed reviews; Roger Ebert praised Gray's direction and the acting, but criticized its screenplay for lack of originality. David Edelstein of New York Magazine commended Phoenix for elevating the film's conflict, writing that it "might be heavy-handed without Phoenix's face—his irresolution somehow more powerful than other actors' resolve. There is no artifice. He's not an actor disappearing into a role but a man disappearing into himself[...]Phoenix homes in on the truth of this person. It's the paradox of the greatest acting".

Later that year, he played a father obsessed with finding out who killed his son in a hit-and-run accident in his second feature with Terry George, the crime drama film Reservation Road. The film received mixed reviews from critics; Peter Travers praised Phoenix's acting stating "Even the best actors – and I'd rank Joaquin Phoenix and Mark Ruffalo among their generation's finest – can't save a movie that aims for tragedy but stalls at soap opera." Phoenix also executive produced the television show 4Real, a half-hour program which began airing in 2007. The series showcased celebrity guests on global adventures "in order to connect with young leaders who are creating social and economic change".

In 2008, Phoenix starred as a suicidal bachelor torn between the family friend his parents wish he would marry and his beautiful but volatile new neighbor in Gray's Two Lovers. The romantic drama premiered at the 2008 Cannes Film Festival. Reviews for the film and Phoenix's performance were positive; New York Magazine'''s chief critic called it his best performance to date and Ray Bennett of The Hollywood Reporter felt that Phoenix led the film with "great intelligence and enormous charm, making his character's conflict utterly believable". During the promotion of Two Lovers, Phoenix had started to film his next performance for the mockumentary film I'm Still Here (2010), which the media felt overshadowed the former's theatrical release. I'm Still Here purports to follow the life of Phoenix, from the announcement of his retirement from acting, through his transition into a career as a hip hop artist managed by rap icon Sean "Diddy" Combs. Directed by Phoenix's then brother-in-law Casey Affleck and co-written by Affleck and Phoenix, the little-seen film premiered at the 67th Venice International Film Festival to mixed reviews; critics were divided on whether to interpret the film as documentary or performance art. After its release, Phoenix explained that the idea for the feature arose from his amazement that people believed reality television shows' claims of being unscripted. By claiming to retire from acting, he and Affleck planned to make a film that "explored celebrity, and explored the relationship between the media and the consumers and the celebrities themselves" through their film.

2011–2018: Established career and continued acclaim
In 2011, it was announced that Phoenix would star in Paul Thomas Anderson's drama film The Master, which traces the relationship between Freddie Quell (Phoenix), a World War II navy veteran struggling to adjust to a post-war society and Lancaster Dodd (Philip Seymour Hoffmann), a leader of a religious movement known as "The Cause". To create the character, Phoenix lost a significant amount of weight and went to a dentist to help force his jaw shut on one side; a trait his own father had. The film premiered at the 2012 Venice Film Festival where he won the Volpi Cup for Best Actor. The art house film only grossed $28 million but was received with critical acclaim, with Phoenix's performance receiving high praise. Peter Travers called it the performance of his career writing "Acting doesn't get better or go deeper[...]Phoenix wears the role like a second skin. You can't take your eyes off him." His performance as Freddie was described as "career-defining" by Todd McCarthy of The Hollywood Reporter, who was impressed that Anderson and Phoenix collaboratively were able to build such complex work around such a derelict figure. Fellow actor Daniel Day-Lewis publicly lauded the "remarkable" Phoenix while accepting the Screen Actors Guild Award, apologizing for the fact that Phoenix hadn't been nominated for the same award. Despite this, Phoenix received his third Academy, Golden Globe and BAFTA nominations for his leading role.

Phoenix and Gray's fourth collaboration came with The Immigrant (2013), a drama film in which he played the supporting role of a pimp who prostitutes Polish immigrant Ewa (Marion Cotillard) and ends up falling for her. The Immigrant and his performance premiered to highly positive reviews at the 2013 Cannes Film Festival. In his review, Ignatiy Vishnevetsky of The A.V. Club thought the film featured one of his best performances and commended Phoenix's and Gray's developing work, writing of that "the two are so perfectly in sync, that it's hard to tell where Phoenix's performance ends and Gray's visual style[...]—begins", further lauding their development of Bruno into "a fully fledged tragic character, even though he is neither the protagonist of The Immigrant nor the main driving force behind its plot".

His next feature film of that year was the Spike Jonze-directed romantic science-fiction drama Her. He played Theodore Twombly, a man who develops a relationship with Samantha (Scarlett Johansson), an intelligent computer operating system personified through a female voice. Released to critical acclaim, critic A.A. Dowd of The A.V. Club labeled Phoenix as "one of the most emotionally honest actors in Hollywood", impressed at how he effortlessly unleashes waves of vulnerability in the film's many tight, invasive close-up images, calling it a "tremendous performance, one that rescues this character—a mess of insecurities, regrets, and desires—from the walking pity party he could have been". Her earned more than double of its production budget, and Phoenix received his fourth nomination at the Golden Globes. Several journalists expressed disappointment over his failure to receive an Oscar nomination for it, with Peter Knegt of IndieWire naming it of one of ten worst Oscar acting snubs of the last decade in 2015.

In 2014, Phoenix took on the role of Doc Sportello, a private investigator and hippie/dope head trying to help his ex-girlfriend solve a crime in the crime comedy-drama Inherent Vice, based on Thomas Pynchon's detective novel of the same name. Reviews toward the film were positive; critics praised Phoenix's performance and Paul Thomas Anderson's direction, while some were frustrated by its complicated plot. Robbie Collin of The Daily Telegraph termed Phoenix as Anderson's "perfect leading man" and his work as "the kind of quietly dazzling performance that rarely wins awards but will be adoringly dissected and quoted for decades". Phoenix earned his fifth Golden Globe nomination for the film.

After narrating the sequel to Earthlings, the 2015 animal rights' documentary Unity, Phoenix teamed with director Woody Allen and Emma Stone in the crime mystery film Irrational Man. He played Abe Lucas, a philosophy professor experiencing an existential crisis. The film was released to mixed reviews at the 2015 Cannes Film Festival; The Hollywood Reporter felt that the film was too similar to Allen's previous films, but praised Phoenix's chemistry with Stone and Phoenix for playing the character "with a wonderful baggy, lived-in quality that makes us want to climb inside the character's whiskey-sozzled head".

The thriller You Were Never Really Here, written and directed by Lynne Ramsay and based on the novella of the same name by Jonathan Ames, ranks among the most acclaimed films of Phoenix's career. The film is about Joe (played by Phoenix), a traumatized former FBI agent and Gulf War veteran who tracks down missing girls for a living. To prepare for the film, Phoenix was advised by a former bodyguard who goes on international missions to rescue children suffering sexual exploitation and abuse by human traffickers; he gained a significant amount of weight and muscle for the part. Phoenix was Ramsay's first and only choice to play the veteran, with Ramsay calling him "my soulmate in making movies". The film premiered at the 2017 Cannes Film Festival, where it received universal acclaim and earned Phoenix the Cannes Film Festival Award for Best Actor. Justin Chang of the Los Angeles Times described Phoenix's performance as "the most rivetingly contained" work of his career and Dominick Suzanne-Mayer of Consequence noted that his evocative manners in the film, led to him giving career-high work and "the kind of haunting turn that only comes around a few times every decade or so".

In 2018, Phoenix portrayed Jesus in the biblical drama Mary Magdalene, written by Helen Edmundson and directed by Garth Davis. The film, and his performance, received mixed reviews; a reviewer for Entertainment Weekly thought that Phoenix lacked the quiet compassion and grace that was required for the role, while Nick Allen of Roger Ebert's website described his performance as "a human being who is visibly tormented by the power and wisdom that works through him", deeming it one of the best portrayals of Jesus ever. His next two featuresthe biopic Don't Worry, He Won't Get Far on Foot and the crime drama The Sisters Brothers were much better received. In the former, Phoenix reunited with his To Die For director Gus Van Sant to portray quadriplegic cartoonist John Callahan. Barry Hertz of The Globe and Mail wrote that there's no better leading actor producing better work than Phoenix, stating "The actor – never a simple chameleon, but someone who disappears into a role entirely with a frightening conviction – continues to display new and tremendous range here" and David Hughes of Empire thought that in a more conventional film, Phoenix would be the favorite to win an Academy Award.

The third film of 2018 was The Sisters Brothers, Jacques Audiard's adaptation of the novel of the same name by Patrick deWitt. The film starred John C. Reilly and Phoenix as the notorious assassin brothers Eli and Charlie Sisters respectively and chronicles their chase after two men who have banded together to search for gold. Writing for Roger Ebert's website, Tomris Laffly commented on Phoenix's and Reilly's "tremendous chemistry" and Lindsey Behr of the Associated Press opined that the duo "excellently manage all the various tones in the film".
Also in 2018, he collaborated with Rooney Mara and Sia to narrate Chris Delforce's documentary Dominion. Animal rights activists have called it one of the most powerful documentaries ever made. For his contribution to the documentary, Phoenix was granted the 2018 Award of Excellence for Narration by Hollywood International Independent Documentary Awards.

2019–present: Joker and further success

In 2019, Phoenix starred as the DC Comics character Joker in Todd Phillips's psychological thriller Joker; an alternative origin story for the character. Set in 1981, the film follows Arthur Fleck, a failed clown and stand-up comedian whose descent into insanity and nihilism inspires a violent counter-cultural revolution against the wealthy in a decaying Gotham City. Phoenix lost  in preparation, and based his laugh on "videos of people suffering from pathological laughter." Released to critical acclaim at the 76th Venice International Film Festival, the film experienced a polarized critical reception after its theatrical release. While Phoenix's performance received rave reviews, the dark tone, portrayal of mental illness, and handling of violence divided opinions and generated concerns of inspiring real-life violence; the movie theater where the 2012 Aurora, Colorado mass shooting occurred during a screening of The Dark Knight Rises refused to show it. Despite this, Joker became a box office success grossing over $1 billion (against its $55 million production budget), the first and only R-rated film to do so, becoming Phoenix's highest-grossing film.
Pete Hammond of Deadline wrote of Phoenix's "extraordinary" performance, describing it as "dazzling risky and original" and The Hollywood Reporters David Rooney called his performance the "must-see factor" of the film, writing "he inhabits [the character] with an insanity by turns pitiful and fearsome in an out-there performance that's no laughing matter[...]Phoenix is the prime force that makes Joker such a distinctively edgy entry in the Hollywood comics industrial complex." The film earned him numerous awards, including an Academy Award, a Golden Globe, a BAFTA, a SAG and a Critic's Choice Award for Best Actor.

In 2020, Phoenix served as an executive producer on Gunda, directed by Viktor Kossakovsky. The acclaimed documentary follows the daily life of a pig, two cows, and a one-legged chicken. That same year, Phoenix was named on the list of the 25 Greatest Actors of the 21st Century by The New York Times. The list was compiled by famed critics Manohla Dargis and A.O. Scott and Phoenix's paragraph was written by his frequent collaborator, director James Gray.

In 2021, he starred in Mike Mills' drama C'mon C'mon, as Johnny, a radio journalist who embarks on a cross-country trip with his young nephew. The A24 film premiered at the 48th Telluride Film Festival to universal acclaim and scored the best per-venue average for a limited release since the start of the COVID-19 pandemic. Angelica Jade Bastién of Vulture praised Phoenix writing "a tremendous showing from Joaquin Phoenix, operating at a register he's rarely found before. It's a career best for him — lovely, empathetic, humane[...]He possesses a warmth that glows from beginning to end. As Johnny, Phoenix listens to people and the world around him with full-bodied curiosity. This is where the bravura lies in the performance: his ability to seemingly just be."

Upcoming projects
Phoenix has five upcoming films. He will star in Ari Aster's Beau Is Afraid, and in January 2021, Deadline Hollywood reported that Phoenix is set to portray Napoleon Bonaparte in Napoleon, his second collaboration with director Ridley Scott. He is also set to reunite with director Lynne Ramsay for an upcoming feature called Polaris, co-starring Rooney Mara. As reported by Variety in June 2022, Phoenix will star in a sequel to Joker written by Scott Silver and Todd Phillips, with the working title Joker: Folie à Deux, alluding to the psychiatric syndrome Folie à deux. He will also co-star with Mara in Pawel Pawlikowski's dramatic thriller The Island.

Reception and acting style

At the beginning of his career, Phoenix was often referred to as "the second most famous Phoenix", his name associated most closely with the death of his brother River Phoenix. The media would often compare the two, with The New York Times describing Joaquin as "sweetly unsettling and endlessly vulnerable" compared to his brother's "pure all-American blond boyishness". After his brother died, Phoenix gained a reputation for his distrust of the media, with many speculating that it is derived from how River's death was covered by the press. He was often asked about the day River died, and still is to this date. Phoenix has described these interviews as "insincere" and has felt that they impeded on the mourning process. Caroline Frost of The Huffington Post has said that Phoenix is "engaging, engaged, mischievous, honest" in person and Anderson Cooper of 60 Minutes thought that he was "wry, shy and couldn't be any more friendlier" adding that Phoenix "just doesn't like to talk about himself". Although known for his intensity and darkness on-screen, director James Gray who worked with Phoenix in four feature films, says that Phoenix is very different off-screen saying "He's actually very tender and sweet and sensitive. It's almost as if he channels his intensity into the characters. Like the work is an outlet for his darker side."

Phoenix has been described as one of the finest actors of his generation. As he achieved stardom after Gladiator (2000), he was conveniently ruled out of teen-idol roles because of his hard gaze and scarred lip. Justin Chang, analyzing his career in Los Angeles Times in 2020, remarked that filmmakers immediately seemed to recognize that Phoenix was more than a heartthrob, and that there was "something more tortured, more vulnerable and infinitely more interesting at play beneath the surface". He noted that through his work, Phoenix is challenging and redefining cinematic manhood and that this quality sets him apart from most of his contemporaries. Renowned film critic and film historian Leonard Maltin has called Phoenix "a true chameleon", writing "[Phoenix] commands the screen and breaks your heart; he makes us feel it all vicariously."

Phoenix is particularly known for his ability to heavily commit to each role he plays and his intense preparations, deeply immersing himself in the characters, often blurring the lines between fiction and reality. That immersion was particularly evident during the filming of the mockumentary I'm Still Here (2010), when Phoenix announced to the world that he was retiring from acting to become a rapper. Throughout the filming period, Phoenix remained in character for public appearances, giving many the impression that he was genuinely pursuing a new career. Media outlets worldwide believed that Phoenix was having a mental breakdown after his infamous appearance on The Late Show with David Letterman. Confusion from the media turned to concern as the seemingly drug-addled Phoenix continued his attempts to convince crowds he was serious about a rap career. Many worried his erratic behavior was a sign he was stuck in a downward spiral, and headed down the same self-destructive path that took the life of his older brother. Although widely suspected to be a mockumentary, the fact that the events of the film had been deliberately staged was not disclosed until after the film had been released. To this day, some people believe he went through a personal meltdown during the filming period. Phoenix has credited the making of I'm Still Here for allowing him to make bolder choices in acting.

Phoenix contends there's no real methodology to the roles he chooses, but has said that he is drawn to complex characters. He speculates that his affinity for dark roles derives from something more ineffable, possibly prenatal saying that "I think there is a combination of nature and nurture[...]—and some of it is my upbringing." Even so, Phoenix remains reluctant to draw a line between his unusual childhood, his private tragedy and his talent for "inhabiting the morose, damaged, violent, and otherwise anxiety-riddled characters". James Gray has described Phoenix as "one of the most incorruptible people I've ever known, and the least superficial", and has spoken of his acting, saying that he admires Phoenix's "limitless ability to surprise you in the best ways and inspire you to move in a direction that you haven't thought of originally, better than what you have in mind". Garth Davis, who directed Phoenix in Mary Magdalene (2018), has remarked that he does not apply method acting, but said that working with Phoenix is like "working with this beautiful wild animal, where you have to give him the space to be free, so his performance can roam freely: raw, uncontrived and truly natural. If he smells the design of the scene, you lose his free spirit; if the script is weak, he will expose its flaws. He is fiercely intelligent and almost completely instinctual. And he has this immense sensitivity that can be both his curse and his gift, but for me, that is what it means to be human". In an interview with The Guardian in 2015, Phoenix claimed that he prefers independent film over major studio film, citing that "the quality of acting suffers".
In 2019, he stated that in choosing films, he solely relies on the director, "I don't really care about genre or budget size, anything like that. It's just whether there is a filmmaker that has a unique vision, has a voice, and the ability to make the film." For Phoenix, a great performance is in the director's hands — it's ultimately the director's world he's entering. He maintains that the director creates the character's arc and that the best directors adjust to what is happening with the actor in the moment.

Phoenix has cited Robert De Niro as one of his favorite actors and strongest acting influences. Phoenix recalled watching Raging Bull for the first time in an interview, "I think it just… awakened something in me. And I could suddenly see it through his eyes. There's a part in Raging Bull where De Niro meets a girl in between a chain-link fence. And he, you know, shakes her pinky and it's like this just beautiful little detail, it's this wonderful moment. And I think that in some ways is what I'm always looking for."

Other ventures
Music
Phoenix has directed music videos for Ringside, She Wants Revenge, People in Planes, Arckid, Albert Hammond Jr., and Silversun Pickups. He was said to have produced the opening track for Pusha T's My Name Is My Name album alongside Kanye West. The track is called "King Push". Phoenix then denied in a statement to XXL having produced the record, saying, "While it was widely reported that Pusha T used my beat and that I produced his song, I can't take any credit. A friend's son played me his music, and all I did was make an introduction to Kanye [West]'s camp."

Animal rights activism
Phoenix is identified as one of the most active celebrities in the animal rights movement. A vegan since age three, he does not wear any clothes made out of animal skin; he requests that all of his leather costumes in films are made from synthetic materials. Phoenix has said that animal rights are one of the most important pillars in his life, and maintains that "climate change is imminent if we do not adopt a plant-based lifestyle". He has helped raise awareness of the correlation between animal rights, climate change and health issues. Phoenix has received praise and accolades from animal rights groups, with PETA naming him "Person of the Year" in 2019.
PETA's president, Ingrid Newkirk said in a statement: "Joaquin Phoenix never misses an opportunity to turn the spotlight away from himself and onto animals' plight and to set a great example of walking the vegan walk". He has been an active supporter of numerous animal rights organizations, including PETA.

Throughout the years, Phoenix has headlined numerous campaigns for different organizations to help promote veganism and end animal slaughter. In 2019, Phoenix and his partner Rooney Mara led the National Animal Rights Day demonstration to help spread awareness for animal rights. On January 10, 2020, Phoenix was arrested with actress Jane Fonda at a climate change protest outside the United States Capitol in Washington, D.C. At the protest, Phoenix spoke about the link between animal agriculture and climate change.

During the 2019–20 awards season, amid protesting for animal rights, Phoenix had been driving a behind-the-scenes movement that transformed five events to meat-free menus, beginning with the Golden Globe Awards. He acknowledged the Hollywood Foreign Press Association during his acceptance speech, for its "very bold move making tonight plant-based. It really sends a powerful message." Soon after, Critics' Choice and SAG followed suit. Phoenix contacted the presidents of the award ceremonies, accompanied by signatures from the likes of fellow nominees Leonardo DiCaprio and Phoebe Waller-Bridge. Phoenix's pitch was that meat agriculture is a leading cause of climate change and that the televised spectacles should use their platforms to address pressing societal issues. The Academy Awards later announced that all food served at the Dolby Theatre before the Oscars was going to be vegan. Lisa Lange, Senior Vice President of Communications at PETA, spoke of Phoenix's power saying "He knows what can be done. He knows he's in a good position to push. He enlists friends. And it works. He can have influence in Hollywood and it influences the rest of the world."

A day after winning the Academy Award for Best Actor, and subsequently delivering a headlining acceptance speech in which he spoke to the plight of mother cows and their babies used in animal agriculture, Phoenix helped to rescue a cow and her newborn calf from a Los Angeles slaughterhouse. They were taken to Farm Sanctuary, an animal sanctuary and advocacy organization, where they will live out the rest of their lives. The same month, he starred in Guardians of Life, the first of twelve short films by the environmental organization Mobilize Earth that highlighted the most pressing issues facing humanity and the natural world. Funds raised by the project went to Amazon Watch and Extinction Rebellion.

Two animal species have been named after him. In 2011, a trilobite species was named Gladiatoria phoenix for his iconic role in the 2000 film Gladiator, and in 2020, a spider species endemic to Iran was named Loureedia phoenixi (also known as the Joker spider) due to its color pattern matching the DC Comics character Joker, for his role in the 2019 film Joker.

Other activism
In 2020, Phoenix collaborated with JusticeLA to create a public service announcement #SuingToSaveLives about the health of people in L.A. County jails amid the COVID-19 pandemic.

Personal life
Views and lifestyle
After re-establishing himself as an actor in the mid-1990s, Phoenix moved back to Los Angeles. He is known for his disdain of celebrity culture, rarely granting interviews, and being reticent about discussing his private life. In 2018, he described himself as a secular Jew who does not affiliate with any organized religion; one of his "core values" is the idea of forgiveness. Phoenix has also claimed that his mother believed in Jesus, though his parents were not religious. While portraying Jesus for the 2018 movie Mary Magdalene, he expressed that the role changed his perspective on the nature of forgiveness.

In early April 2005, Phoenix checked himself into rehab to be treated for alcoholism. Twelve years later, he revealed that he did not need an intervention: "I really just thought of myself as a hedonist. I was an actor in L.A. I wanted to have a good time. But I wasn't engaging with the world or myself in the way I wanted to". On January 26, 2006, while driving down a winding canyon road in Hollywood, Phoenix veered off the road and flipped his car. The crash was reportedly caused by brake failure. Shaken and confused, he heard someone tapping on his window and telling him to "just relax". Unable to see the man, Phoenix replied, "I'm fine. I am relaxed." The man replied, "No, you're not." The man then stopped Phoenix from lighting a cigarette while gasoline was leaking into the car cabin. Phoenix realized that the man was German filmmaker Werner Herzog. While Herzog helped Phoenix out of the wreckage by breaking the back window of the car, bystanders called an ambulance. Phoenix approached Herzog to express his gratitude.

In 2012, Phoenix labeled the Academy Awards "bullshit". He later gave an interview apologizing for his comments, and acknowledged that the awards provide an important platform for many deserving filmmakers. He elaborated on the topic while on Jimmy Kimmel Live! in 2015, explaining that he is uncomfortable receiving accolades for his work in films when he considers the filmmaking process to be a collaborative one.

A longtime vegan, Phoenix finds animal agriculture "absurd and barbaric". He explained his reasoning behind his veganism; "To me, it just seems obvious – I don't want to cause pain to another living empathetic creature. I don't want to take its babies away from it, I don't want to force it to be indoors and fattened up just to be slaughtered. Certainly, also, the effect that it has on our environment is devastating. So, for me, it's my life and has always been my life, and it's really one of the most important things to me."

Relationships and family
From 1995 to 1998, Phoenix dated his Inventing the Abbotts co-star Liv Tyler. The two remain close friends, with Tyler considering Phoenix and his sisters as her family.<ref></></ref> He was romantically involved with South African model Topaz Page-Green from 2001 to 2005. Phoenix is currently on the board of directors for The Lunchbox Fund, a non-profit organization which provides daily meals to students of township schools in Soweto, South Africa, founded by Page-Green.

In 2012, Phoenix met Her co-star Rooney Mara. The two remained friends and began a romantic relationship four years later, during the making of Mary Magdalene. Their engagement was confirmed in July 2019 and the following year, the couple were reported to be expecting their first child together. On August 25, 2020 Mara gave birth to their son, named River Lee after Phoenix's late brother. They reside in the Hollywood Hills. Phoenix has described his family life as simple. He enjoys meditating, watching documentaries, reading scripts and taking karate classes. He has a black belt in karate.

Filmography and accolades

According to the review aggregator site Rotten Tomatoes and the box-office site Box Office Mojo, Phoenix's most critically acclaimed and commercially successful films include Parenthood (1989), To Die For (1995), Gladiator (2000), Signs (2002), Brother Bear (2003), The Village (2004), Walk the Line (2005), Two Lovers (2008), The Master (2012), The Immigrant (2013), Her (2013), Inherent Vice (2014), You Were Never Really Here (2017) and Joker (2019).

Phoenix has been recognized by the Academy of Motion Picture Arts and Sciences for the following performances:
73rd Academy Awards (2001): Best Supporting Actor, nomination, as Commodus in Gladiator78th Academy Awards (2006): Best Actor, nomination, as John R. "Johnny" Cash in Walk the Line85th Academy Awards (2013): Best Actor, nomination, as Freddie Quell in The Master92nd Academy Awards (2020): Best Actor, win, as Arthur Fleck / Joker in JokerPhoenix has won two Golden Globe Awards: Best Actor – Motion Picture Musical or Comedy for Walk the Line and Best Actor – Motion Picture Drama for Joker, a BAFTA Award for Best Actor in a Leading Role and a Screen Actors Guild Award for Outstanding Performance by a Male Actor in a Leading Role for Joker.

Phoenix was awarded the Grammy Award for Best Compilation Soundtrack for Visual Media for the Walk The Line soundtrack. He has also won the Volpi Cup for Best Actor at the 69th Venice International Film Festival for The Master and the Best Actor Award at the 70th Cannes Film Festival for You Were Never Really Here''.

Phoenix and River Phoenix hold the distinction of being the only brothers nominated for acting Academy Awards. Both Phoenix and Heath Ledger won an Academy Award for their performances as the Joker, becoming the second pair of actors to win Academy Awards for playing the same character – the other pair being Marlon Brando and Robert De Niro, who won Best Actor and Academy Award for Best Supporting Actor respectively, for their portrayals of Vito Corleone.

See also

 List of actors with Academy Award nominations
List of actors with two or more Academy Award nominations in acting categories
List of Jewish Academy Award winners and nominees
List of Puerto Ricans
 List of animal rights advocates
 List of vegans

Notes

References

External links

 
 
 

 
1974 births
Living people
20th-century American male actors
21st-century American male actors
American animal rights activists
American environmentalists
American film producers
American humanitarians
American male child actors
American male film actors
American male television actors
American male voice actors
American music video directors
American people of English descent
American people of French descent
American people of German descent
American people of Hungarian-Jewish descent
American people of Russian-Jewish descent
American street performers
American veganism activists
Best Actor Academy Award winners
Best Actor BAFTA Award winners
Best Drama Actor Golden Globe (film) winners
Best Musical or Comedy Actor Golden Globe (film) winners
Cannes Film Festival Award for Best Actor winners
Grammy Award winners
Male actors from Gainesville, Florida
Male actors from San Juan, Puerto Rico
Method actors
Outstanding Performance by a Male Actor in a Leading Role Screen Actors Guild Award winners
People from Los Angeles
People from Río Piedras, Puerto Rico
Joaquin
Volpi Cup for Best Actor winners